Lansing is an unincorporated community in Fayette County, West Virginia, United States. Lansing has a post office with ZIP code 25862.

References

Unincorporated communities in Fayette County, West Virginia
Unincorporated communities in West Virginia